The Piano Concerto No. 26 in D major, K. 537, was written by Wolfgang Amadeus Mozart and completed on 24 February 1788. It is generally known as the Coronation Concerto.

The concerto is scored for solo piano, one flute, 2 oboes, 2 bassoons, 2 horns, 2 trumpets, timpani (in D, A), and strings.

Origin of the nickname "Coronation" 
The traditional name associated with this work is not Mozart's own, nor was the work written on the occasion for which posterity has named it. Mozart remarked in a letter to his wife in April 1789 that he had just performed this concerto at court. (While this performance on 14 April has often been assumed to have been the work's premiere, H. C. Robbins Landon considers this "exceedingly unlikely".) But the nickname "Coronation" was derived from his playing of the work at the time of the coronation of Leopold II as Holy Roman Emperor in October 1790 in Frankfurt am Main. At the same concert, Mozart also played the Piano Concerto No. 19, K. 459.

Alan Tyson in his introduction to Dover Publications' facsimile of the autograph score (which today is in the Morgan Library & Museum in New York) comments that "Although K. 459 has at times been called a 'Coronation' concerto, this title has nearly always been applied to K. 537".

Movements 
The concerto has the following three movements:

The second and third movements have their tempos given above in parentheses because in the autograph these are not given in Mozart's own handwriting but were written in by someone else. (The Neue Mozart-Ausgabe [NMA V/15/8, ed. Wolfgang Rehm] places the note "Tempobezeichnung im Autograph von fremder Hand" ["Tempo indication in autograph by another hand"] on both movements, though the old Breitkopf & Härtel Complete Works edition does not have any indication that the tempos are not Mozart's own.)

The unfinished keyboard part 

There is a very unusual feature to this concerto. In addition to omitting the tempi for two of the movements, Mozart also, in Tyson's words, "did not write any notes for the piano's left hand in a great many measures throughout the work." As can be seen in the Dover Publications facsimile, large stretches of the solo part simply have nothing at all for the left hand, including the opening solo (mvmt. I, mm. 81–99) and the whole of the second movement. There is in fact no other Mozart piano concerto of which so much of the solo part was left unfinished by the composer.

The 1794 first edition had these gaps filled in, and most Mozart scholars such as Alfred Einstein and Alan Tyson have assumed that the additions were made by the publisher Johann André. Einstein is on record as finding André's completion somewhat wanting: "For the most part, this version is extremely simple and not too offensive, but at times—for example, in the accompaniment of the Larghetto theme—it is very clumsy, and the whole solo part would gain infinitely by revision and refinement in Mozart's own style."

Nearly all of the passages that necessitated filling in for the first edition lack only simple accompanimental patterns such as Alberti bass figures and chords. For example, measures 145–151 of the first movement, which involve more complicated virtuoso passagework, are fully written out in the autograph. For the less complex portions of the solo, it is clear that Mozart "knew perfectly well what he had to play" and so left them incomplete.

The old Breitkopf & Härtel Mozart Complete Works score of this concerto does not make any distinction between what Mozart himself wrote and what André (or someone commissioned by him) supplied. However, the Neue Mozart-Ausgabe volume referenced above prints André's supplements in smaller type, to clearly distinguish them from Mozart's own notes.

Critical reception 

While this concerto enjoyed a great popularity at the time due to its beauty and rococo (or galant) style, later judgments have been more divided. Some authories have judged it to be of a lower quality than the twelve previous Viennese piano concertos or the final concerto in B. This amounts to a complete reversal of critical opinion, since K. 537 used to be one of Mozart's most celebrated keyboard concertos, especially during the 19th century. Still in 1935, Friedrich Blume, editor of the Eulenburg edition of this work, described it as "the best known and most frequently played" of Mozart's piano concertos. But writing in 1945, the musicologist Alfred Einstein commented:

Nonetheless, the "Coronation" concerto remains frequently performed today, and more recently prominent Mozart's interpreters, such as the pianist Mitsuko Uchida and the conductor Colin Davis, have described it as an underrated masterpiece.

References

Sources 
Wolfgang Amadeus Mozart, Neue Mozart-Ausgabe, Serie V, Werkgruppe 15, Band 8, ed. Wolfgang Rehm. (Baerenreiter-Verlag, Kassel, 1960; BA 4524). Reprinted in Mozart: The Piano Concertos/Baerenreiter Urtext, ISMN M-006-20470-0, published in 2006. The "Coronation Concerto" can be found on pp. 3–92 (Vol. III, pp. 309*-398* in the reprint edition).
Wolfgang Amadeus Mozart, Piano Concertos Nos. 23–27 in Full Score (NY: Dover Publications, 1978). . Reprint of the 19th century Breitkopf & Härtel Mozart Complete Works edition of these concertos; the "Coronation Concerto" is on pp. 187–242.
Alfred Einstein, Mozart: His Character, His Work. Trans. Arthur Mendel and Nathan Broder. (London: Oxford University Press, 1945). .
Alan Tyson, "Introduction," in Mozart: Piano Concerto No. 26 in D Major ("Coronation"), K. 537—The Autograph Score. (NY: Pierpont Morgan Library in association with Dover Publications, 1991), pp. vii–xi. .
Steven Ledbetter, "Mozart: Piano Concerto No. 26," program notes at Pro Arte's web site.

External links 

26
Collection of the Morgan Library & Museum
1788 compositions
Compositions in D major